Remembering Merle is the title of a recording by American folk music artists Doc Watson and Merle Watson, released in 1992. The songs were all recorded live between 1970 and 1976.

Track listing
 "Frosty Morn" (Traditional) – 3:44
 "Omie Wise" (Traditional) – 5:52
 "Frankie and Johnny" (Traditional) – 3:23
 "Honey Babe Blues" (Traditional) – 3:01
 "St. James Infirmary" (Joe Primrose, Traditional) – 3:52
 "Honey Please Don't Go" (Hodges) – 2:30
 "Nancy Rowland/Salt Creek" – 1:55
 "Miss the Mississippi and You" (Halley) – 4:20
 "Nine Pound Hammer" (Merle Travis) – 2:46
 "Summertime" (George Gershwin, Ira Gershwin, DuBose Heyward) – 3:30
 "New River Train" (Traditional) –  3:38
 "Black Mountain Rag" (Traditional) – 2:39
 "Southern Lady  Hill" – 3:36
 "Mama Don't Allow It" (Cahn, Davenport) – 5:02
 "Blue Suede Shoes" (Carl Perkins) – 2:35
 "Wayfaring Stranger" – 3:30
 "Thoughts of Never" (Watson) – 2:35

Personnel
 Doc Watson – guitar, vocals
 Merle Watson – guitar, banjo, steel guitar, vocals
 T. Michael Coleman – bass, harmony vocals
 Joe Smothers – guitar, harmony  vocals
 Bob Hill – piano, guitar, harmony vocals
 Charles Cochran – piano
Production notes
 Produced by T. Michael Coleman

References

External links
  Doc Watson discography

1992 live albums
Doc Watson live albums
Sugar Hill Records live albums